Chaillac-sur-Vienne (literally Chaillac on Vienne) is a commune in the Haute-Vienne department in the Nouvelle-Aquitaine region in western France.

Inhabitants are known as Chaillacois.

See also
Rochechouart impact structure
Communes of the Haute-Vienne department

References

Communes of Haute-Vienne